In enzymology, a glycerol dehydratase catalyzes the chemical reaction

glycerol  3-hydroxypropanal + H2O

This enzyme belongs to the family of lyases, specifically the hydro-lyases, which cleave carbon-oxygen bonds.  The systematic name of this enzyme class is glycerol hydro-lyase (3-hydroxypropanol-forming). Other names in common use include glycerol dehydrase, and glycerol hydro-lyase.  This enzyme participates in glycerolipid metabolism.  It employs one cofactor, cobalamin.

Structural studies

References

 
 
 
 

EC 4.2.1
Cobamide enzymes
Enzymes of known structure